The Destroyer War Badge as a World War II German military decoration and awarded to officers and crew for service on Kriegsmarine destroyers. It was instituted on 4 June 1940 by Grand Admiral Erich Raeder following the battle of Narvik. It was also awarded to the crews of torpedo boats and fast attack craft until the institution of the Fast Attack Craft War Badge.

Design
The medal, designed by Paul Carsberg of Berlin, consists of an outer oakleaf laurel wreath of oak leaves with the national emblem of eagle clutching a swastika (both golden coloured) at its apex. The central area features a side-view of a destroyer cutting through a wave (both silver-grey to black in colour). It was worn on the lower part of the left breast pocket of the naval service tunic, underneath the 1st class Iron Cross if awarded. Additionally, an embroidered cloth version was produced.

Criteria for award
Required qualifications prior to 10 October 1940 included participation in the battles of Narvik. After this date:
 Wounded in action
 Served on ship sunk in action (Z1)
 Participation in three enemy engagements or at least in 12 non-enemy sorties
 Outstanding performance or other heroic deeds in a single action

Notes

References

Awards established in 1940
Military awards and decorations of Nazi Germany
1940 establishments in Germany